DNA polymerase iota is an enzyme that in humans is encoded by the POLI gene. It is found in higher eukaryotes, and is believed to have arisen from a gene duplication from Pol η. Pol ι, is a Y family polymerase that is involved in translesion synthesis. It can bypass 6-4 pyrimidine adducts and abasic sites and has a high frequency of wrong base incorporation. Like many other Y family polymerases Pol ι, has low processivity, a large DNA binding pocket and doesn't undergo conformational changes when DNA binds. These attributes are what allow Pol ι to carry out its task as a translesion polymerase. Pol ι only uses Hoogsteen base pairing, during DNA synthesis, it will add adenine opposite to thymine in the syn conformation and can add both cytosine and thymine in the anti conformation across guanine, which it flips to the syn conformation.

References

Further reading

DNA replication
DNA-binding proteins